On August 28, 2022, a 19-year-old man allegedly opened fire in Detroit, Michigan, United States, randomly killing three people on the city's streets over a span of two hours and fifteen minutes. A fourth person and a dog were injured. Each person was shot in separate locations, and had no known connection to the shooter nor any known gang affiliation. The suspected shooter was apprehended at his house in Detroit about 14 hours later, and was formally charged two days later.

Events
At 4:45 a.m., the suspect shot a 28-year-old man without provocation, walked away and then returned to fire more shots. This victim's body was found in the doorway of a church.

About 30 minutes later, police responded to a 911 call three blocks away. While officers were investigating this shooting, they heard gunshots that led them to the 19700 block of Livernois Avenue. They found a 44-year-old woman had been shot and killed. According to Wayne County Major Crimes Commander Michael McGinnis, the shooter initially left, but then he returned and shot her again. A 16-year-old girl was then shot and killed around 5:30 a.m., The fourth shooting occurred at 7:10 a.m. The 80-year-old victim and his dog both survived.

Accused 
The 19-year-old male suspect, Dontae Smith, was arrested at his house in Detroit. He was charged with three counts of first-degree murder, one count of assault with intent to murder, one count of third-degree animal cruelty, and five counts of felony firearm on August 31. Smith's family said he was hallucinating before the shooting, thought that his family members wanted to kill him, and believed the world was ending. a Clinical Psychologist believes Smith is suffering from psychosis, or another mental illness that causes delusions. Smith's bond is set at $1,000,000.

See also
 List of homicides in Michigan
 2022 Bend, Oregon shooting, which occurred on the same day

References

2022 active shooter incidents in the United States
2022 in Michigan
2020s crimes in Michigan
2022 shootings
August 2022 crimes in the United States
2022 shootings
Spree shootings in the United States